The Desert Dispatch is a newspaper in the town of Barstow, California, founded in 1910. Thomson Newspapers bought the Dispatch in 1978. In 1995, Thomson traded the paper to Freedom Communications. In 2014, Freedom sold the paper to New Media Investment Group.

References

External links
 

Gannett publications
Daily newspapers published in California
Newspapers established in 1910
1910 establishments in California
Thomson Reuters